The 1930 United States Senate election in Louisiana was held on November 4, 1930.

On September 9, Governor of Louisiana Huey Long defeated incumbent Senator Joseph E. Ransdell in the Democratic primary with 57.31% of the vote. 

At this time, Louisiana was a one-party state, and the Democratic nomination was tantamount to victory. Long won the November general election without an opponent.

Democratic primary

Campaign
The incumbent governor of Louisiana, Huey Long, decided to challenge the incumbent senator Ransdell as a referendum on his program in the state. Huey ran with the support of his own machine while the new regulars merged with the old regulars to support Ransdell.

Candidates
Huey Long, Governor of Louisiana
Joseph E. Ransdell, incumbent Senator

Results

General election

References

1930
Louisiana
United States Senate
Huey Long
Single-candidate elections